Oh Schucks....It's Schuster! is a 1989 South African film. It is one of South Africa's candid camera king, Leon Schuster's movies.

Plot
In a series of short skits, Leon Schuster uses candid camera and several disguises to stitch up the general public of South Africa. Such sketches include:
The jumping telephone.
The snake in the suitcase (which was used in his later film Mr Bones).
The Radio Jacaranda broadcast that refuses to do as is wished by the producer.

Cast
Leon SchusterMike Van Der BergEddie EcksteinRuda LandmanDerek WattsTrudie SloaneOrg SmalHugo TaljaardDawie Van HeerdenTheo ConradieFrik Pieterse

1989 comedy films
1989 films
South African comedy films
Afrikaans-language films
English-language South African films